Bram Vandenbussche (born 1 February 1981 in Bruges) is a Belgian professional footballer who is currently attached to SVV Damme.

He usually plays as central defender, although he is sometimes fielded as defensive midfielder in times of need. His heading is his strongest point.

Career
Vandenbussche started his career at Cercle Brugge, where he made his first team debut on 17 December 2000, in a 1–2 home loss against Maasland. His last match was against SV Roeselare, his new team. Cercle won 1–2.

In 2002, Bram Vandenbussche won the Cercle Brugge Pop Poll.

In the 2005-2006 season, Vandenbussche startled the Belgian football competition when he failed a doping test. Traces of corticosteroids were found. Luckily for Vandenbussche, he could prove that he had suffered from his back. The Cercle Brugge medical staff had given him an injection for this, so they also took responsibility for Vandenbussche's positive doping test.

After becoming a back-up player for Cercle, Bram Vandenbussche signed a contract for 3 years with SV Roeselare. He will meet his former coach Dennis Van Wijk there. Vandenbussche played more than 22 years for the green and black side.

Trivia
 Bram Vandenbussche holds an academic degree of physical education.
 His father has a bakery in Assebroek, a municipality of Bruges.

References

External links
 
 Bram Vandenbussche player info at the official Cercle Brugge site 

Living people
1981 births
Footballers from Bruges
Belgian footballers
Cercle Brugge K.S.V. players
Association football defenders
Ghent University alumni
Belgian Pro League players
Challenger Pro League players
Association football utility players
K.S.V. Roeselare players